Solenopsis solenopsidis is a species of ant in the genus Solenopsis. It is endemic to Argentina.

References

solenopsidis
Endemic fauna of Argentina
Hymenoptera of South America
Insects described in 1953
Taxonomy articles created by Polbot